Gonçalo José Valada Amorim (30 September 1972 – 1 May 2012) was a Portuguese cyclist. He competed in the men's individual road race at the 2004 Summer Olympics. Amorim killed himself with a shotgun in his home in 2012.

References

1972 births
2012 suicides
Portuguese male cyclists
Olympic cyclists of Portugal
Cyclists at the 2004 Summer Olympics
Suicides by firearm in Portugal
People from Cartaxo
Sportspeople from Santarém District